Ian Stafford Ross Munro (1919–1994) was an Australian ichthyologist and marine biologist who worked for CSIRO from 1943 until his retirement. From 1963 he led the Gulf of Carpentaria Prawn Survey. He is honoured in the specific name of the fish Crapatalus munroi.

See also
:Category:Taxa named by Ian Stafford Ross Munro

References

1919 births
1994 deaths
20th-century Australian zoologists
Australian ichthyologists
Australian zoologists
Australian marine biologists